Roger Frank White (born 22 November 1943) is a former English cricketer.  White was a right-handed batsman who bowled slow left-arm orthodox.  He was born at Perivale, Sussex.

White made his first-class debut for Middlesex against Nottinghamshire in 1964 County Championship.  He made twelve further first-class appearances for the county, the last of which came against Oxford University in 1966.  In his thirteen first-class matches for Middlesex, he took 17 wickets at an average of 30.47, with best figures of 4/79.  A tailend batsman, he scored a total of 18 runs at an average of 3.60, with a high score of 7 not out.

References

External links
Roger White at ESPNcricinfo
Roger White at CricketArchive

1943 births
Living people
People from Ealing
English cricketers
Middlesex cricketers